Dexopollenia testacea is a species of cluster fly in the family Polleniidae.

Distribution
Nepal, India.

References

Polleniidae
Insects described in 1917
Diptera of Asia